De Los Santos Medical Center is a 150-bed private tertiary hospital in Quezon City, Philippines managed by Metro Pacific.

Founded on September 17, 1949, by Dr. Jose V. De Los Santos Sr., the Father of Philippine Orthopedics, and his wife Doña Pacita V. De Los Santos, the De Los Santos Clinic was a 30-bed infirmary which specialized in providing treatment and rehabilitation to patients with bone abnormalities. Eventually, the clinic expanded in 1973 to become De Los Santos General Hospital. From then, its specialization included Internal medicine, obstetrics & gynecology, pediatrics, and surgery.

In 2013, De Los Santos Medical Center became the 7th member under the largest hospital operator in the country, the Metro Pacific Hospital Holdings, Inc. (MPHHI). With the financial backing of MPHHI, De Los Santos Med is now capable of performing services in critical care and neo-natal medicine, neurosurgery, kidney transplantation, and cardiovascular medicine.

References

Buildings and structures in Quezon City
Hospitals in Quezon City
Hospitals established in 1949